The 31st National Assembly of Quebec was the provincial legislature in Quebec, Canada that was elected in the 1976 Quebec general election.  It sat for six sessions from 14 December 1976 to 23 December 1976; from 8 March 1977 to 22 December 1977; from 21 February 1978 to 20 February 1979; from 6 March 1979 to 18 June 1980; on 24 October 1980 (one day); and from 5 November 1980 to 12 March 1981.  The Parti Québécois led by René Lévesque came to power for the first time, and organized the 1980 Quebec sovereignty referendum, which resulted in a win for the "no" side.  The Quebec Liberal Party opposition was led by interim leader Gérard D. Levesque and later by Claude Ryan.

Seats per political party

 After the 1976 elections

Member list

This was the list of members of the National Assembly of Quebec that were elected in the 1976 election:

Other elected MNAs

Other MNAs were elected in by-elections during this mandate

 Reed Scowen, Quebec Liberal Party, Notre-Dame-de-Grâce, July 5, 1978 
 Claude Ryan, Quebec Liberal Party, Argenteuil, April 30, 1979 
 Jean-Claude Rivest, Quebec Liberal Party, Jean-Talon, April 30, 1979 
 Hermann Mathieu, Quebec Liberal Party, Beauce-Sud, November 14, 1979 
 Georges Lalande, Quebec Liberal Party, Maisonneuve, November 14, 1979 
 Solange Chaput-Rolland, Quebec Liberal Party, Prévost, November 14, 1979 
 Herbert Marx, Quebec Liberal Party, D'Arcy-McGee, November 26, 1979 
 Pierre Paradis, Quebec Liberal Party, Brome-Missisquoi, November 17, 1980 
 Camille Picard, Quebec Liberal Party, Johnson, November 17, 1980 
 Fabien Bélanger, Quebec Liberal Party, Mégantic-Compton, Megantic-Compton, November 17, 1980 
 Pierre Fortier, Quebec Liberal Party, Outremont, November 17, 1980

Cabinet Ministers

 Prime Minister and Executive Council President: René Lévesque
 Deputy Premier: Jacques-Yvan Morin
 Agriculture: Jean Garon (1976–1979)
 Agriculture, Fisheries and Food: Jean Garon (1979–1981)
 Labour and Workforce: Jacques Couture (1976–1977), Pierre-Marc Johnson (1977-1980), Pierre Marois (1980–1981)
 Public Works and Provisioning: Lucien Lessard (1976–1977), Jocelyne Ouellette (1977–1981)
 Public Office: Denis De Belleval (1976–1979), François Gendron (1979–1981)
 Cultural Affairs: Louis O'Neill (1976–1978), Denis Vaugeois (1978–1981)
 Cultural Development: Camille Laurin (1977–1980)
 Cultural and Science Development: Camille Laurin (1980–1981)
 Immigration: Jacques Couture (1976–1980), Gérald Godin (1980–1981)
 Social Affairs: Denis Lazure
 Social Development: Pierre Marois (1977–1980), Lise Payette (1980–1981)
 Status of Women : Lise Payette (1976–1981)
 Education: Jacques-Yvan Morin (1976–1980), Camille Laurin (1980–1981)
 Youth, Recreation and Sports: Claude Charron (1977–1979)
 Tourism, Hunting and Fishing: Lucien Lessard (1976–1979)
 Recreation, Hunting and Fishing: Lucien Lessard (1979–1981)
 Transportation: Lucien Lessard (1976–1979), Denis De Belleval (1979–1981)
 Communications: Louis O'Neill (1976–1979), Denis Vaugeois (1979–1980), Clément Richard (1980–1981)
 Municipal Affairs: Guy Tardif (1976–1980), Jacques Léonard (1980–1981)
 Environment: Marcel Léger (1977–1981)
 Energy: Guy Joron (1977–1979)
 Lands, Forests and Natural Resources: Yves Bérubé (1976–1979)
 Energy and Resources: Yves Bérubé (1979–1981)
 Intergovernmental Affairs: Claude Morin
 Parliamentary and electoral reform: Robert Burns (1977–1979)
 Electoral reform: Marc-André Bedard (1979–1981)
 Parliamentary Affairs: Claude Charron (1979–1981)
 Industry and Commerce: Rodrigue Tremblay (1976–1979)
 Industry, Commerce and Tourism: Yves Duhaime (1979–1981)
 Planning: Jacques Leonard (1977–1980), Guy Tardif (1980–1981)
 Consumers, Cooperatives and Financial: Lise Payette (1976–1979), Guy Joron (1979–1980), Pierre Marc Johnson (1980)
 Housing: Guy Tardif (1980–1981)
 Justice: Marc-André Bedard
 Finances and President of the Treasury Board: Jacques Parizeau
 Revenu: Jacques Parizeau (1976–1979), Michel Clair (1979–1981)
 Economic Development: Bernard Landry (1977–1981)

New electoral districts

A significant electoral map reform took place in 1980 and was effective for the 1981 general elections.  The number of seats went from 110 to 122.

The following electoral districts were created:
 Bertrand (in Montérégie; not the modern Bertrand, which is in Laurentides)
 Chapleau
 Chomedey
 Groulx
 Joliette
 La Peltrie
 Laval-des-Rapides
 Marie-Victorin
 Marquette
 Nelligan
 Nicolet
 Pontiac
 Rousseau
 Rouyn-Noranda–Témiscamingue
 Ungava
 Vachon
 Viger
 Vimont

The following electoral districts disappeared:
 Joliette-Montcalm
 Laurentides-Labelle
 Laval
 Pointe-Claire
 Pontiac-Témiscamingue
 Rouyn-Noranda

References
 1976 election results
 List of Historical Cabinet Ministers

Notes

31